The Australian Institute of Marine Science (AIMS) is a tropical marine research centre located primarily at Cape Ferguson in the locality of Cape Cleveland, City of Townsville Queensland, Australia. Established in 1972 by the McMahon Government, the institute's primary function is research for sustainable use and protection of the marine environment. The Institute investigates topics from broad-scale ecology to microbiology.

AIMS is committed to the protection and sustainable use of Australia's marine resources. Its research programs support the management of tropical marine environments around the world, with a primary focus on the Great Barrier Reef World Heritage Area, the pristine Ningaloo Marine Park in Western Australia and northwest Australia.

AIMS' headquarters are located on a 207-hectare coastal site 50 km from Townsville, Queensland, in a scientific zone surrounded by National Park and Marine Reserve. The location was selected because of its proximity to the geographical centre of the Great Barrier Reef and access to clean seawater. This strategic position provides a fast transition from the sea to the laboratory, a key advantage in marine science.

Two smaller offices, in Perth, Western Australia, and Darwin, Northern Territory, provide direct links for research partners and clients in these regions.

Marine Science Developments 
AIMS are a part of an Australian-wide focus of marine science investment projects to improve: technologies, infrastructure and response systems to Australian marine issues. As part of a Super Science Initiative (SSI), Australia back in 2012 invested AUD$387.7 million in marine and climate science to boost protection and response systems for the undersea realm (Coffin, 2012).

The Institute discovered the oldest tropical fish, a midnight snapper fish, in Dec 2020. It was determined to be 81 years old.

See also
Network of Aquaculture Centres in Asia-Pacific
Nicole Webster

References 

 Coffin, M. (2012). Australian developments in marine science. Eos, Transactions American Geophysical Union, 93(30), 289-290. doi: 10.1029/2012eo300002

External links

Australian Institute of Marine Science website. Australian Government

Commonwealth Government agencies of Australia
1972 establishments in Australia
City of Townsville
Scientific organisations based in Australia